Covaci is the Romanian form of the name Kovač (Ковач), meaning "forger" or "blacksmith" in Slavic languages.

Cognates 
 Kovač in Croatia, Bosnia-Herzegovina, Serbia, Slovakia, the Czech Republic and Slovenia
 Kovac in the United States and parts of South America was often shortened from a longer last name given out to people who couldn't spell their last name.  Example: Dukovac was shortened to Kovac.  
 Koval in Ukraine (also Kovalchuk, Kovalenko, Kovalev)
 Kowal in Poland (also Kowalczyk, Kowalski)
 Kovach, the Carpatho-Ruthenian form
 Kovács, Kováts or Kovách in Hungary
 Kováč in Slovakia
 Kovář (also Kováč) in Czech Republic.

Notable people 
 Ion Covaci, also known as Ianos Kovacs or János Kovács, Romanian boxer
 Iosif Covaci, Romanian alpine skier
 Meletie Covaci, Romanian Catholic bishop
 Nicolae Kovács, Romanian-Hungarian football player and coach
 Nicu Covaci, Romanian painter, music composer, leader of rock and cult band Phoenix
 Ştefan Covaci, Romanian football player and coach

Places 
 Covaci, a village in Sânandrei commune, Timiș County, Romania

Sports 
 ACS Fortuna Covaci, a Romanian professional football club from Covaci, Timiș County, Romania

Other 
 Covaci Solar Park,  a thin-film photovoltaic (PV) power system, north of Timișoara, Romania

Slavic-language surnames
Romanian-language surnames